Zhernokovo is a rural locality (a village) in Pertsevskoye Rural Settlement, Gryazovetsky District, Vologda Oblast, Russia. The population was 259 as of 2002.

Geography 
Zhernokovo is located 24 km east of Gryazovets (the district's administrative centre) by road. Gridino is the nearest rural locality.

References 

Rural localities in Gryazovetsky District
Gryazovetsky Uyezd